Mumbuni Boys' School (also known as Mumbuni School) is an extra county school in Kenya which is located  from Machakos town. It is the second largest school in Machakos County, after Machakos School with over 1,200 students.

History and operations
The school was started in 1965 under the sponsorship of the Africa Inland Church (AIC) at a site near Scott Theological College and shifted to the current location in 1975 to accommodate the ever growing number of students. 

The school had "A" level classes for boys only during the former education system. The last A-level class sat for exams in 1989.

The school used to be a mixed school but on 7 February 2005, the girls moved across the road to their own school, Mumbuni Girls High School.

Campus
The school spreads over 32 acres.

Administration
The school has had six principals: Mr. Simon Mwatu (1965–1969), Mr. Daniel K. Mulwa (1969–1986), Mr. Benedict Kavita (1986–1996), Mr. Timothy Mwove (1996–2003), Mr. Julius Kasuni (2003–2008), Mr. Timothy Mutiso Wambua (2009-2017), Mr. Peter Nzioka has served since August 2017.

Notable alumni
Daniel "Churchill" Ndambuki, two former members of the Kenyan parliament, Mutinda Mutiso and Daudi Mwanzia. former Machakos County assembly speaker, Mr. B. M. Mungata, Mercy K. Wambua Chief Executive Officer of the Law Society of Kenya, Noor Ahmed Mohamed African Statesman 2030 are among its alumni.

Sports
The school is active in various sports like rugby, football, handball, volleyball, tennis, basketball just to name a few.

See also

 Education in Kenya
 List of schools in Kenya

References

1966 establishments in Kenya
Boys' schools in Kenya
Education in Eastern Province (Kenya)
Educational institutions established in 1966
Machakos County
High schools and secondary schools in Kenya